Şerbettar railway station is a station in the village of Şerbettar, Turkey in East Thrace. The station is located on an unnamed road in the extreme northwest of the village. TCDD Taşımacılık operates a daily regional train from Istanbul to Kapıkule, which stops at Şerbettar. The station consists of a short side platform servicing one track.

The station was opened in 1971 by the Turkish State Railways.

References

External links
Station timetable

Railway stations in Edirne Province
Railway stations opened in 1971
1971 establishments in Turkey